Howard High School, Zimbabwe  Howard High School is a Salvation Army (private sponsored) boarding school located more than 70 kilometres Northeast of Harare in Glendale, Zimbabwe. It was established as a mission school in 1923 by The Salvation Army together with Howard Hospital which is just adjacent to it and with which it has shared a perimeter wall for most of its history.

Description
Howard High School has approximately 800 students and most of them stay on campus except for a few who come from the surrounding communities and the children of the teaching and ancillary staff and children of Howard Hospital staff. Students are housed according to the year they are in and their sex. The house names were given after birds of prey and they are;

Howard High School has been in existence since 1923. It was founded by The Salvation Army organization and which provides an administrator, boarding master (for the boys) and a matron (for the girls), these officials are responsible for the non-academic management of the school, since the academics is managed by teachers and officials provided by the Ministry of Primary and Secondary Education of Zimbabwe. Students that attend the school are seeded in Christian values in accordance to the doctrine of the Salvation Army.

Howard High School has been a leading academic school in Zimbabwe reputed for great academic results at Junior Certificate, which is administered by The Salvation Army Schools Association, then Ordinary Level and Advanced Level, of which in these two higher levels the examinations are coordinated by The Zimbabwe Schools Examinations Council.

Notable alumni

Politicians 
Joseph Wilfred Msika, a Zimbabwean politician who served as Vice President of Zimbabwe from 1999 to 2009
Joice "Teurai-Ropa" Mujuru, former Vice-President of Zimbabwe

Contact information
Postal Address:
Howard High School
Private Bag 230,
Chiweshe,
Glendale,
Mashonaland Central,
Zimbabwe

Telephone (Administrator) +263 (0) / (Headmaster) +263 (0)

References

Schools in Zimbabwe
Educational institutions established in 1923
1923 establishments in Southern Rhodesia